Paul Kendall Niven Jr. (September 20, 1924 – January 7, 1970) was CBS television journalist and presidential debate moderator. He was one of Ed Murrow's team of reporters at CBS. Born in Boston, Massachusetts, he and his family returned to Brunswick, Maine in 1931. He was the son of Paul K. Niven Sr., the editor and newspaper publisher of The Brunswick Record.

Early life 
Niven grew up in Brunswick, Maine at 26 Longfellow Ave. His childhood home was located next to Bowdoin College and across from Pickard Field. Niven graduated from Bowdoin College with an A.B. degree in 1946.

Military service 
He joined the US Army Air Force in 1943, and left the service in 1946.

Work experience 
After attending post-graduate school at the London School of Economics and Political Science Niven went to work on the London staff of CBS news. Niven also wrote for the Manchester Guardian. While in London Niven covered the British 1950-1951 elections, the 1953 coronation of Queen Elizabeth. From France he covered the United Nations Assembly. Niven also documented the rise of Nikita Khrushchev, and the triumph of Van Cliburn in Moscow.
After work in England. Niven was hired to head up the new news department for WTOP just purchased from CBS station in Washington DC by Washington Post publisher Phil Graham. He was recruited by Ed Murrow to work for CBS. Moderator of face the nation from 1961 thru 1965. From January to October 1959 Niven was Moscow bureau chief for CBS News and heard daily on the CBS World News Roundup radio show. On October 8, 1958 the Soviet Union closed the CBS News Bureau in Moscow and ordered Niven to leave Russia because the CBS show Playhouse 90 had broadcast "The Plot to Kill Stalin" on September 25.  Niven left on October 13.

National Educational Television
On July 7, 1966 Niven left CBS for National Educational Television as its lead correspondent, for which he interviewed Svetlana Alliluyeva, daughter of Soviet dictator Josef Stalin. She said that since her father's death (on March 5, 1953), the Soviet Union had not changed despite "de-Stalinization" and that Russia's leaders had even taken "steps backwards." She was interviewed in connection with the publication of her memoir "Far-Away Music".

Burma experience 
Niven spent the last six months of 1956 touring Burma for a "See It Now" show.

Death 
Niven died from head trauma as a result of house fire at his home in Washington, D.C. on January 8, 1970.

References

1924 births
1970 deaths
People from Boston
People from Greater Boston
United States Army Air Forces personnel of World War II
Bowdoin College alumni
Alumni of the London School of Economics
American expatriates in the United Kingdom
Deaths from fire in the United States
Deaths from head injury